"Epstein didn't kill himself" is a phrase referring to multiple theories surrounding the death of Jeffrey Epstein that dispute the official but contentious ruling of suicide by hanging. Epstein was an American financier and convicted sex offender with connections to powerful and wealthy people, and his reported suicide led to numerous hypotheses about the nature and cause of his death. The phrase became a now very famous and widely accepted colloquialism as well as an internet meme, gaining traction in November 2019 as more of the circumstances around his death became public. The most common theory asserts that the true cause of his death was homicide, via strangulation, arranged by one or more co-conspirators to prevent him from revealing any compromising information. As a result, some people have used "epstein" as a verb to refer to instances of murder— by the arrangement of powerful criminals— of people with compromising information which officials rule as suicides.

The meme "Epstein didn't kill himself" is often inserted into unexpected contexts like a photo caption of the painter Bob Ross or at the end of a social media post as a non sequitur. The meme has appeared at multiple televised sports games in the form of signs and painted bodies. Several people have also randomly interjected the phrase at the end of interviews. It is used by individuals of all sides of the political spectrum without agreement on the specific details of Epstein's death.

Background 

On August 10, 2019, American financier and convicted sex offender Jeffrey Epstein was found unresponsive in his Metropolitan Correctional Center jail cell, where he was awaiting trial on new sex trafficking charges. According to the Department of Justice, Federal Bureau of Prisons official statement, "He was transported to a local hospital for treatment of life-threatening injuries and subsequently pronounced dead by hospital staff." The New York City medical examiner ruled Epstein's death a suicide by hanging. Epstein's lawyers challenged that conclusion and opened their own investigation. Epstein's brother Mark hired board-certified forensic pathologist Michael Baden to oversee the autopsy. In late October, Baden announced that autopsy evidence indicated homicidal strangulation more than suicidal hanging. Both the FBI and the U.S. Department of Justice's inspector general conducted investigations into the circumstances of his death, and the guards on duty were later charged with conspiracy and record falsification.

Due to violations of normal jail procedures on the night of Epstein's death, the malfunction of two cameras in front of his cell, and his claims to have compromising information about powerful figures, his death generated doubt about his apparent suicide and speculation that he was murdered.

At an August 27 hearing, Epstein defense attorney Reid Weingarten expressed "significant doubts" that Epstein's death was due to suicide. According to Weingarten, when attorneys met with their client shortly before his death, "we did not see a despairing, despondent, suicidal person". Epstein's brother, Mark, has rejected the possibility of Jeffrey's suicide, claiming, "I could see if he got a life sentence, I could then see him taking himself out, but he had a bail hearing coming up." He also claimed his "life may also be in danger", if Epstein was indeed murdered. In a press conference about two months after Epstein's death, Bill de Blasio, the then mayor of New York City, declined to endorse chief medical examiner Sampson's conclusions, saying, "Something doesn't fit here. It just doesn't make sense that the highest-profile prisoner in America—you know, someone forgot to guard him." Former US Attorney and Senate Judiciary Committee counsel Brett Tolman said the death was "more than coincidental" considering Epstein's "many connections to powerful people".

Mainstreaming 

At the end of an interview with Jesse Watters on Fox News, former Navy SEAL and founder of the Warrior Dog Foundation Mike Ritland asked if he could give a "PSA". After being told that he could, he stated, "If you see the coverage [about combat dogs] and you decide I want one of these dogs, either buy a fully trained and finished dog from a professional or just don't get one at all. That, and Epstein didn't kill himself." Ritland later stated his purpose for suddenly mentioning the phrase was to keep the Jeffrey Epstein story alive. According to The Washington Post, the meme gained a large amount of attention in the immediate aftermath of this interview.

Arizona Republican Congressman Paul Gosar shared the meme in a series of 23 tweets where the first letter of each tweet spelled out the phrase. Australian rapper Matthew Lambert of Hilltop Hoods, after winning the 2019 ARIA Music Award for Best Australian Live Act, included the phrase in his acceptance speech.

2020 Golden Globe Awards 
In his opening monologue at the 77th Golden Globe Awards, host and comedian Ricky Gervais joked that the suicidal character of his show After Life will come back for a second season. He added: "So in the end, he obviously didn't kill himself — just like Jeffrey Epstein. I know he's your friend, but I don't care."

Platforms 
The meme has been shared by individuals on a number of platforms including Facebook and Twitter. Podcast host Joe Rogan and Internet personality Tank Sinatra used Instagram to spread the meme to their followers, which in Rogan's case had included Mike Ritland. The "Epstein didn't kill himself" meme has also appeared in TikTok videos, which notably is frequented by a younger user base.

Several users on dating apps, such as Tinder and Hinge, have written in their profiles that whether or not someone accepts the premise of the meme is a relationship deal breaker. In the 2020 Mardi Gras celebration in New Orleans, a Le Krewe d'Etat parade float featured a large float with effigies of Epstein and Hillary Clinton.

Products 
Two beer companies, the Michigan-based Rusted Spoke Brewing Co. and the Californian Tactical OPS Brewing, advertised specialty-branded beers in connection to the meme. Rusted Spoke's operations manager told the Detroit Free Press that people just thought the meme was funny. In Switzerland, the Zürich-based company Kaex printed the meme on promotional material for an anti-hangover product.

Computer programmer, businessman, and presidential candidate John McAfee announced the release of an Ethereum-based token named after the meme. He had previously expressed doubts about Epstein's death. 700 million tokens of the cryptocurrency were released to 8,000 users following its airdrop. Following McAfee's death, many, particularly followers of QAnon, started using "McAfee didn't kill himself" in reference to the meme, the similarities of the reporting, and the fact that McAfee was an outspoken supporter of the phrase.

Holiday-themed merchandise, such as Christmas sweaters, which prominently feature the phrase also became available for sale through several online retailers. In an interview with Slate, independent merchandisers indicated that the Christmas/Epstein product lines were selling comparatively well and cited the mashup's dark humor for its internet popularity. According to Variety, the Christmas-themed paraphernalia was reportedly outselling Game of Thrones merchandise.

Vandalism 
The phrase has been connected to several incidents of vandalism including its appearance "on road signs and overpasses around the country". One specific incident saw the meme painted on 7-foot-high boulder and visible to travellers on Washington State Route 9 in Snohomish, causing a bit of controversy in the local community.

The site of a popular art piece at the Art Basel in Miami, Comedian, a banana that had been duct-taped to a wall, was vandalized when Roderick Webber of Massachusetts wrote " didn't kill himself" in red lipstick on the wall which Comedian had previously occupied. Webber was arrested for criminal mischief, and he reportedly spent a night in jail.

Reactions 
NPR's Scott Simon compared the bait-and-switch aspect of the meme to rickrolling. He also worried that doing a news story about the meme could spread misinformation. Federal prosecutors have tried to discourage the spread of the theory, but the Associated Press reported, "[t]he phrase 'Jeffrey Epstein didn't kill himself' has taken on a life of its own—sometimes more as a pop culture catchphrase than an actual belief."

Writer James Poulos cited the advancement of social media and growing populist sentiments for the meme. Commentators have also suggested that growing distrust of government and the elite played a large factor in its popularity as well. Jeet Heer with The Nation has expressed his worries that this could lead to the meme becoming a useful tool for recruitment for the far-right; but Adam Bulger, in a featured article for BTRtoday, dismissed Heer's concerns and encouraged the Democratic Party to embrace the meme.

In an article for Mel Magazine published shortly before the Fox News interview, Miles Klee wrote that there were numerous factors for the meme's rise online; among these included a "simmering resentment" and a lack of justice for Epstein's victims. He further explained that a large attraction of sharing the "Epstein didn't kill himself" meme was it served as a method to keep the Epstein story within the news cycle. Author Anna Merlan has instead argued that the meme over time tends to trivialize the concerns of Epstein's victims. However, she mentioned that Jane Doe 15, who on November 19, 2019, publicly alleged that Jeffrey Epstein had raped her, wore a bracelet featuring the phrase "Epstein didn't kill himself" at a public press conference to possibly indicate her belief in the theory.

Notes

References

Further reading 

 
 
 
 
 
 
 
 
 
 

2019 controversies in the United States
American political catchphrases
Conspiracy theories in the United States
Death conspiracy theories
Hashtags
Interjections
Internet memes introduced in 2019
Didn't kill himself
Political Internet memes
Political quotes
Slogans